The Abraham Avinu Synagogue is a synagogue in the Jewish Quarter of Hebron. Built by Hakham Malkiel Ashkenazi in 1540, its domed structure represented the physical center of the Jewish Quarter of the Old City of Hebron. The synagogue became the spiritual hub of the Jewish community there and a major center for the study of Kabbalah. It was restored in 1738 and enlarged in 1864; the synagogue stood empty since the 1929 Hebron massacre, was destroyed after 1948, was rebuilt in 1977 and has been open ever since.

History

The synagogue is mentioned by Rabbi Naftali Hertz Bachrach in his 1648 book Emek HaMelech. The book deals with the kabbalah, but in the introduction, he mentions a dramatic story about the Avraham Avinu synagogue.

Jordan took control of the area in 1948, and after this time a wholesale market, trash dump and public toilet were placed on the site of the Jewish Quarter. The ruins of the synagogue were turned into a goat and donkey pen.  The adjacent, "Kabbalists' Courtyard" was turned into an abattoir.

In 1971 the Israeli Government approved the rebuilding of the synagogue, courtyard and adjoining buildings. The synagogue was reopened in 1977.

The man instrumental in rebuilding the synagogue was local Hebron resident Ben Zion Tavger. He was a prominent physicist in the Soviet Union at Gorky University noted for his work in the Magnetic Symmetry phenomenon. He moved to Israel in 1972 and became a chair at Tel Aviv University.

Today, the rebuilt synagogue is used each Friday night by the Jewish residents of Hebron to hold prayer services. The synagogue is also open to visitors each day of the week so they can learn about the history of the synagogue, and hold private services.

Today, a plaque with the cover of the book Emek HaMelech and the full text in the original printing hangs on a plaque on the wall of the rebuilt Avraham Avinu synagogue.

See also
List of oldest synagogues

References

Further reading

External links
Photo gallery of Avraham Avinu synagogue including vintage and modern pictures.
Abraham Avinu Synagogue's website
Avraham Avinu Synagogue page on Hebron.com
Video of Prof. Ben Zion Tavgar discussing his excavation of the Avraham Avinu Synagogue (Hebrew)
Video historical overview of Avraham Avinu neighborhood

Orthodox Judaism in the West Bank
Orthodox synagogues
Synagogues in the West Bank
Jews and Judaism in Hebron
16th-century synagogues
Rebuilt synagogues
Religious buildings and structures completed in 1540
Buildings and structures demolished in 1948